Héctor Luis Delgado Román (born September 4, 1979) is a Puerto Rican rapper, singer and record producer, formerly known by his stage names Héctor el Father and Héctor el Bambino.

After retirement, he obtained a degree in Theology at Southern Methodist University and dedicated his life to preaching the Christian faith in his homeland of Puerto Rico. In his recent work as a preacher he has touched many lives, moving many rappers to follow in his footsteps including Tito el Bambino and Almighty. He has also been prolific in the field of linguistics, coining terms like , as well as phrases including  (which has seen widespread use in get-out-the-vote campaigns recently, as well as foreplay, and less so in the original sense of gangster violence). He announced his retirement in 2008, but his series of Farewell Concerts went until May 2010. He rose to fame as a member of the duo Héctor & Tito. As a producer Delgado has worked with several reggaeton producers, as well as Emilio Estefan. In 2018, he made a comeback with his autobiographic movie Conocerás la verdad, released on March 22, 2018. In 2021, he returned to music under his real name Héctor Delgado, with his third studio album La Hora Cero which contains only religious music.

Career

Los Bambinos 
Héctor joined Efraín Fines Nevares (later known as Tito El Bambino) and formed the duo Héctor & Tito ("Los Bambinos"). Héctor & Tito released their first album in 1998. Together they became reggaeton stars releasing several successful albums and making appearances in several compilations, becoming one of the most sought-out duos in the genre. Both became the first reggaeton artists to sell out a massive concert in Puerto Rico, opening the path to other artists such as Tego Calderón, Daddy Yankee, Don Omar, and Wisin & Yandel. As a duet both captured the world's attention and made reggaeton a popular genre, winning awards such as the Billboard Latin Music Award for Latin rap album of the year for their album A la Reconquista.

In 2004, the duo announced their breakup, and each of them has continued with their separate careers.

Gold Star Music 
Delgado followed the success of Trébol Clan with his own compilation album titled Los Anormales which went on to break all record sales in Puerto Rico with 130,000 copies sold in just two days. Los Anormales featured reggaeton artists such as Daddy Yankee, Don Omar, Trébol Clan, Divino, Zion and the duo Alexis & Fido.

In February, Delgado performed in the Canary Islands during their big Carnival festivities. His performance was a sold-out success. His song "Baila Morena", which Delgado produced for Héctor & Tito, was one of the songs with the most airplay in Puerto Rico.

Roc-A-Fella Records 
In mid-2005, Delgado signed an agreement with Roc-A-Fella Records owner Jay-Z to promote him in the United States through the newly founded Roc-A-Fella sub-label Roc-La-Familia. The label, created to house international artists, would have Jay-Z and Héctor both produce and perform on a compilation album. The album titled Los Rompe Discotekas featured top-of-the-line artists both from United States hip hop and Spanish reggaeton music industries.

Additionally, Delgado became the Hispanic image for, what was at that time, the Roc-A-Fella-owned clothing line Rocawear. The advertising campaign including his image was featured in TV spots, print, and billboards. The agreement included a deal for Rocawear to sponsor Delgado's own clothing designs under the label Bambino. The clothing deal included Héctor designing tennis shoes to be released as part of the Jay-Z's "S. Carter Collection" under Reebok.

Solo career 
On September 16, 2005, he presented two sold-out concerts titled The Bad Boy in Puerto Rico with artists like Wisin & Yandel, Alexis & Fido, Trébol Clan, Fat Joe, Polaco and others.

Delgado has become one of the most successful producers, not only in the reggaeton genre, but in the Latin American music business, even working with renowned Cuban producer Emilio Estefan.

In January 2008, Delgado decided to lose weight and contracted José Bonilla, a personal trainer to help him. He also began practicing the Atkins diet. At the beginning of this weight program he weighed 221 pounds and by the end had lost 31 pounds.

"Harlem Shake" controversy 
It was confirmed by Delgado that an audio clip from a remix called "Los terroristas" with the line  was used uncredited in the opening of Baauer's "Harlem Shake", which became a viral internet sensation in February 2013. Baauer had referred to the voice in the opening of his song, as "The dude in the beginning I got somewhere off the Internet, I don't even know where" in an earlier interview. Delgado told WAPA-TV's Lo Sé Todo that he was working with his lawyers and that he planned to meet with them the next week to discuss his next steps.

Diplo, head of Mad Decent and frontman of dancehall group Major Lazer helped settle the legal dispute in April 2013.

As pastor 
Delgado retired in 2008 and is now a Christian pastor. A biopic called Conocerás la verdad about his life was released in select theaters in 2018. Contemporary reggaeton artist Daddy Yankee attended the film's premier showing.

Remixes 
In 2018, Bad Bunny did a remix of Héctor el Father's "Vamos Pa' la Calle".

Discography

Studio albums 
 2006: The Bad Boy
 2008: El Juicio Final
 2021: La Hora Cero

Live albums 
 2007: Bad Boy: The Concert

Compilation albums 
 2002: The Godfather
 2004: Los Anormales
 2005: Sangre Nueva
 2005: Gold Star Music: Reggaeton Hits
 2006: Los Rompe Discotekas
 2007: El Rompe Discoteka: The Mix Album
 2007: The Bad Boy: The Most Wanted Edition
 2008: Mi Trayectoria

References

External links 
 
 

 
Living people
People from Carolina, Puerto Rico
Puerto Rican reggaeton musicians
Puerto Rican rappers
Puerto Rican musicians
Puerto Rican Christians
Converts to Christianity
Reggaeton record producers
Machete Music artists
Universal Music Latino artists
Roc-A-Fella Records artists
21st-century American rappers
1979 births